Mahavanona is a town and commune in Madagascar. It belongs to the district of Antsiranana II, which is a part of Diana Region. It is located at the Besokatra River on the Route nationale 6 between Antsiranana and Anivorano Nord.

According to 2001 commune census the population of Mahavanona was 12,075.

Primary and junior level secondary education are available in town. The majority 52% of the population are farmers, while an additional 46% receives their livelihood from raising livestock. The most important crop is rice, while other important products are bananas and maize.  Services provide employment for 1% of the population. Additionally fishing employs 1% of the population.

References and notes 

Populated places in Diana Region